Kiss the Ring  is the sixth studio album by American disc jockey and record producer DJ Khaled. It was released under We the Best Music Group, Terror Squad Entertainment, Young Money Entertainment, Cash Money Records, and Universal Republic Records on August 21, 2012. The album was supported by the singles "Take It to the Head" which peaked at number 58 on the Billboard Hot 100 and "I Wish You Would" which peaked at number 78 on the Billboard Hot 100. The album features guest appearances from Meek Mill, Ace Hood, Plies, Lil Wayne, T.I., Future, Kanye West, Rick Ross, Chris Brown, Nicki Minaj, J. Cole, Big K.R.I.T., Kendrick Lamar, Big Sean, Wiz Khalifa, T-Pain, Scarface, Nas, DJ Premier, French Montana, Jadakiss, Birdman, 2 Chainz, Wale, Tyga, Kirko Bangz, Mavado and Mack Maine.

Background
On December 10, 2011, DJ Khaled announced the title of his next album, Kiss the Ring, via video, with the release date as "coming soon", presumed 2012. The album cover and release date were released in a video promoting the album on May 24, 2012. Guests on the album are Ace Hood, Lil Wayne, T-Pain, Kendrick Lamar, Rick Ross, Chris Brown, Kanye West, Wale, Nas, among others. The production team consists of Jahlil Beats, Mike WiLL Made It, Hit-Boy, The Runners, J. Cole, K.E. on the Track, J.U.S.T.I.C.E. League, DJ Premier, The Beat Bully, Detail, Boi-1da, DJ Toomp, Sonny Digital, DASECA Productions and The Olympicks.

Singles 
The album's first single "Take It to the Head, released on March 27, 2012, featured Chris Brown, Rick Ross, Nicki Minaj and Lil Wayne. On May 20, 2012, the music video for "Take It to the Head" featuring Chris Brown, Rick Ross, Nicki Minaj and Lil Wayne premiered on MTV Jams. On June 27, 2012, the album's second single "I Wish You Would" featuring Kanye West and Rick Ross was released. It is produced by Hit-Boy. The music video for "I Wish You Would" premiered on BET's 106 & Park on August 13, 2012, along with the music video for West's single "Cold".

The song "Bitches & Bottles (Let's Get It Started)" featuring Future, T.I. and Lil Wayne was released as a promotional single and debuted at number nine on the Bubbling Under Hot 100 Singles chart. "They Ready" featuring J. Cole, Big K.R.I.T. & Kendrick Lamar, "I Did It For My Dawgz" featuring Meek Mill, Rick Ross, French Montana & Jadakiss, and "Hip Hop" featuring Scarface, Nas & DJ Premier were also released as promotional singles prior to the album's release. On August 17, 2012, the music video was released for "Don't Get Me Started" featuring Ace Hood. On August 20, 2012, the music video was released for "Suicidal Thoughts/Aktion Pack" featuring Mavado. On December 2, 2012, the music video for "Bitches & Bottles (Let's Get It Started)" featuring Future, T.I., Lil Wayne, and Ace Hood premiered on MTV Jams. On December 5, 2012, the music video was released for "I Did It for My Dawgs" featuring Rick Ross, Jadakiss, Meek Mill, Ace Hood and French Montana.

Critical reception 

Kiss the Ring received generally positive reviews from contemporary music critics. At Metacritic, which assigns a normalized rating out of 100 to reviews from mainstream critics, the album received an average score of 62, which indicates "generally favorable reviews", based on seven reviews. In a mixed review, Edwin Ortiz of the HipHopDX, claimed the album "is a series of single tracks that hit or miss, and one can only imagine what DJ Khaled's batting average is at now". In the highest-score review, XXL editor Adam Fleischer, said the Kiss the Ring "is brief and overrun with enough proven formulas and artists that the opportunity for a miss barely exists". Mark Bozzer from Canadian music magazine Exclaim! reviewed the album saying "Khaled goes through his hip-hop Rolodex yet again and compiles a strong collection of MCs and producers to add some shine to his latest musical collage". AllMusic editor David Jeffries characterized as "a run-of-the-mill Khaled album and that mill is still doing pretty awesome". In the review which the album had the lowest score, Consequence of Sound editor Mike Madden said: "unfortunately, Kiss the Ring often sounds like it was made just to vault the celebrity-status and net worth of the man on its cover."

Commercial performance 
The album debuted at number four on the US Billboard 200, selling 41,000 copies in its first week. It also peaked at number three on Top R&B/Hip-Hop Albums. As of September 11, 2012, it had sold 63,000 copies in the US. Then by September 2013, the album had sold 108,000 copies in the United States.

Track listing

Charts

Weekly charts

Year-end charts

References

2012 albums
DJ Khaled albums
Albums produced by Boi-1da
Albums produced by DJ Toomp
Albums produced by Hit-Boy
Albums produced by J.U.S.T.I.C.E. League
Albums produced by J. Cole
Albums produced by the Runners
Albums produced by Mike Will Made It
Albums produced by Jahlil Beats
Albums produced by Detail (record producer)
Albums produced by DJ Khaled
Albums produced by Sonny Digital
Cash Money Records albums